The following highways have been numbered 920:

Costa Rica
 National Route 920

United States